Tri is a novel by Slovenian author Peter Zupanc. It was first published in 2001.

See also
List of Slovenian novels

Slovenian novels
2001 novels